I'm Waiting 4 You is the fourth studio album by Japanese J-Pop band Garnet Crow. It was released on December 8, 2004 under Giza Studio label.

Background
The album consist of three previously released singles, such as Bokura Dake no Mirai, Kimi wo Kazaru Hana wo Sakasou and Wasurezaki.

The track Sky, which was previously released in their mini album First Kaleidoscope has received new album mix under title new arranged track. This version of Sky is included in their first compilation album Best.

Ameagari no Blue was performed for the first time in their live tour Garnet Crow Livescope 2004 -Kimi to Iu Hikari- before the official recording release.

Commercial performance 
"I'm Waiting 4 You" made its chart debut on the official Oricon Albums Chart at #11 rank for first week with 35,917 sold copies. It charted for 10 weeks and sold 64,347 copies.

Track listing 
All tracks are composed by Yuri Nakamura, written by Nana Azuki and arranged by Hirohito Furui.

Personnel
Credits adapted from the CD booklet of I'm Waiting 4 You.

Yuri Nakamura - vocals, backing vocals, composing
Nana Azuki - songwriting, keyboard
Hirohito Furui - arranging, keyboard
Hitoshi Okamoto - acoustic guitar, bass
Miguel Sa' Pessoa - arranging
Katsuyuki Yoshimatu - recording engineering
Aki Morimoto - recording engineering
Akio Nakajima - mixing engineering
Tomoko Nozaki - mixing engineering
Masahiro Shimada - mastering engineering
Gan Kojima - art direction
Kumiko Nishida - art direction
Kanonji - executive producer

Usage in media 
Bokura Dake no Mirai: theme song in Fuji TV program Sport!
Kimi wo Kazaru Hana wo Sakasou: ending theme for Anime television series Monkey Turn
Wasurezaki: ending theme for Anime television series Detective Conan

References 

2004 albums
Being Inc. albums
Giza Studio albums
Japanese-language albums
Garnet Crow albums
Albums produced by Daiko Nagato